The Ringgold Gap Battlefield, in Catoosa County, Georgia, preserves the scene of the Battle of Ringgold Gap in the American Civil War.

According to the National Park Service:

The site was listed on the U.S. National Register of Historic Places on March 12, 2011. The listing was announced as the featured listing in the National Park Service's weekly list of March 18, 2011.

A small pocket park in Ringgold Gap commemorates the battle. A monument to soldiers from New York who sustained heavy casualties stands near Tiger Creek at the Ringgold Water Treatment Plant.  A new monument in honor of Major General Patrick Cleburne and his men is located in the small pocket park. The nearby Western and Atlantic Depot still shows scars from the damage it received from artillery fire during the battle.  The Ringgold Gap Battlefield was listed on the National Register of Historic Places in 2011.

References

External links

Protected areas of Catoosa County, Georgia
Battlefields of the Western Theater of the American Civil War
National Register of Historic Places in Catoosa County, Georgia
Conflict sites on the National Register of Historic Places in Georgia (U.S. state)